Yuliya Volodymyrivna Pidlisna (born 12 May 1987) is a Ukrainian swimmer who won a silver medal in the 200 m breaststroke at the 2006 European Aquatics Championships. She also competed in three events at the 2008 Summer Olympics, but did not reach the finals.

In November 2003 she was banned from FINA competitions for two years after testing positive for the anabolic steroid Stanozolol at the European Junior Championships.

References

1987 births
Living people
Ukrainian female swimmers
Female breaststroke swimmers
Olympic swimmers of Ukraine
Swimmers at the 2008 Summer Olympics
European Aquatics Championships medalists in swimming
Sportspeople from Kharkiv
21st-century Ukrainian women